Hedi Souid (born 22 August 1983) is a Tunisian rugby union player. Hedi Souid's choice of position is prop.

He plays for Montluçon Rugby since 2006/07.

He is currently the captain of Tunisia.

External links
Hédi Souid Statistics

1983 births
Living people
Tunisian rugby union players
Rugby union props
Tunisian expatriate rugby union players
Expatriate rugby union players in France
Tunisian expatriate sportspeople in France